Bouzov is a municipality and village in Olomouc District in the Olomouc Region of the Czech Republic. It has about 1,500 inhabitants.

Administrative parts
Villages of Bezděkov, Blažov, Doly, Hvozdečko, Jeřmaň, Kadeřín, Kovářov, Kozov, Obectov, Olešnice, Podolí, Svojanov are administrative parts of Bouzov.

Geography
It lies in the Zábřeh Highlands.

Sights

The municipality is well known for the Bouzov Castle.

Notable people
Hans Balatka (1827–1899), American conductor and composer

References

Villages in Olomouc District